Burlington is a village in Calhoun County in the U.S. state of Michigan. The population was 261 at the 2010 census. It is part of the Battle Creek, Michigan Metropolitan Statistical Area.  The village is located within Burlington Township on M-60.

History
Burlington was platted in 1842 and incorporated as a village in 1869.

Geography

Demographics

2010 census
As of the census of 2010, there were 261 people, 96 households, and 68 families residing in the village. The racial makeup of the village was 98.1% White and 1.9% from two or more races.

There were 96 households, of which 37.5% had children under the age of 18 living with them, 55.2% were married couples living together, 8.3% had a female householder with no husband present, 7.3% had a male householder with no wife present, and 29.2% were non-families. 24.0% of all households were made up of individuals, and 5.2% had someone living alone who was 65 years of age or older. The average household size was 2.72 and the average family size was 3.19.

The median age in the village was 37.3 years. 24.9% of residents were under the age of 18; 7.3% were between the ages of 18 and 24; 26.8% were from 25 to 44; 30.3% were from 45 to 64; and 10.7% were 65 years of age or older. The gender makeup of the village was 52.1% male and 47.9% female.

2000 census
As of the census of 2000, there were 405 people, 142 households, and 115 families residing in the village. The racial makeup of the village was 96.79% White, 0.74% Native American, 0.74% Asian, 0.74% from other races, and 0.99% from two or more races. Hispanic or Latino of any race were 0.74% of the population.

There were 142 households, out of which 35.2% had children under the age of 18 living with them, 63.4% were married couples living together, 12.0% had a female householder with no husband present, and 19.0% were non-families. 16.9% of all households were made up of individuals, and 6.3% had someone living alone who was 65 years of age or older.  The average household size was 2.85 and the average family size was 3.13.

In the village, the population was spread out, with 28.4% under the age of 18, 7.4% from 18 to 24, 31.4% from 25 to 44, 20.7% from 45 to 64, and 12.1% who were 65 years of age or older.  The median age was 36 years. For every 100 females, there were 92.9 males.  For every 100 females age 18 and over, there were 101.4 males.

The median income for a household in the village was $32,857, and the median income for a family was $35,750. Males had a median income of $30,938 versus $23,750 for females. The per capita income for the village was $23,240.  About 10.4% of families and 15.2% of the population were below the poverty line, including 30.1% of those under age 18 and 12.5% of those age 65 or over.

References

Villages in Calhoun County, Michigan
Villages in Michigan
Populated places established in 1842
1842 establishments in Michigan